Titanium Beta C refers to Ti Beta-C, a trademark for an alloy of titanium originally filed by RTI International.  It is a metastable "beta alloy" which was originally developed in the 1960s; Ti-3Al-8V-6Cr-4Mo-4Zr, nominally 3% aluminum, 8% vanadium, 6% chromium, 4% molybdenum, 4% zirconium and balance (75%): titanium.

Properties

Beta C is relatively easy to melt and process during fabrication, when compared with other beta alloys. It is not recommended in high-wear applications due to its tendency to gall. Beta C has good corrosion resistance to both saline environments and acids, due to the properties of titanium and to its ability to spontaneously form a well adhered protective oxide layer when exposed to a high oxygen environment. Beta C is one of the least dense beta alloys, which combined with its ability to achieve high strengths through heat treatment provides a good strength to weight ratio.  It is also capable of consistent high strength through relatively large section thicknesses.

Applications

The properties of Beta C have led to its use in a number of niche applications, including parts of aircraft landing gear and in fasteners used in the automotive industry.  Beta C is also used in oilfield applications such as pressure housings, shafts, valves and other critical components where very high strength and excellent corrosion resistance are required.  It is especially useful in components which must meet NACE MR0175 for H2S exposure.

Composition

Beta C is composed primarily of titanium, with relatively large (3-8.5% each) additions of molybdenum, aluminium, zirconium, chromium and vanadium, and smaller amounts (0.3 - 0.005% each) of iron, hydrogen, nitrogen, oxygen, yttrium, carbon, and other elements.

Designations

Other designations for Beta C include:
 Ti-3Al-8V-6Cr-4Mo-4Zr
 Ti-3-8-6-4-4
 ASTM Grade 19 and Grade 20 (with 0.05% Pd)
 AMS 4957
 AMS 4958
 AMS 4945
 MIL –T –9046 B3
 MIL –T –9047
 UNS R58640 (Grade 19)
 UNS R58645 (Grade 20)

Common Alloy Name:     Ti Beta-C

Nominal Composition:     Ti-3Al-8V-6Cr-4Zr-4Mo

Type:     Near-Beta and Beta Alloy

Alloy Description:     A heat-treatable, deep section hardenable, very high strength Ti alloy possessing good toughness/strength properties, low elastic modulus and elevated resistance to stress and localized corrosion in high temperature sweet and sour brines.

Approved for use in sour ( H2S ) applications.  Material is approved to be certified to meet NACE MR0175 and ISO 15156 with a maximum hardness of HRC 42.

Fabricated Products Available:     Forged and Machined components - various

Mill Product Forms Available:     Ingot, Bloom, Bar, Billet, Seamless Pipe, Wire

Typical Applications:     Geothermal brine energy extraction, Landing gear components, Navy ship components, Hydrocarbon production/drilling, Power plant cooling system components

References

Titanium alloys